This article is a list of diseases of lettuce (Lactuca sativa).

Bacterial diseases

Fungal diseases

Miscellaneous diseases and disorders

Nematodes, parasitic

Phytoplasma, Viral and viroid diseases

References
Common Names of Diseases, The American Phytopathological Society

Lettuce